Gihan Nilendra Wikramanayake, FBCS, CITP (17 January 1960 – 5 January 2018) was a Sri Lankan academic. He was a Senior Professor in Computer Science and attached to the Department of Information Systems Engineering. He was the Director of the University of Colombo School of Computing (UCSC) from 24 May 2010 to 31 May 2016. He was the Head of the Department of Information Systems Engineering from September 2002 to September 2005. He also served as the deputy director of the UCSC from 2003 to 2006.

Education 
Educated at St. Aloysius' College (Galle) and Royal College Colombo, he graduated from the University of Colombo with a BSc in Statistics & Mathematics with First Class Honours in 1984 and went on to gain a MSc and PhD in Computer Science from the University of Wales, College of Cardiff in 1989 and 1996.

Academic career 

In 1984 he joined the Computer Centre of the University of Colombo as a trainee programmer, he moved to the Department of Statistics and Computer Science as a researcher before becoming an Assistant Lecturer. In 1990 he became a Lecturer and Senior Lecturer in 1996. Moving to the new  Department of Computer Science in 2000 he became its acting Head in 2002.

In 2002 he became the  Head, Department of Information Systems Engineering, UCSC and  deputy director, UCSC in 2004. From 2007 to 2008 he was the acting Head, Department of Communication and Media Technologies. He was also a visiting scholar of University of New Mexico, Stockholm University and Umeå University. In 2010 he became the Director of the UCSC and a professor of Computer Science. He served two terms as director UCSC.

A fellow of the British Computer Society he served as the Chairman of the BCS Sri Lanka Section for five years from 2007/08, 2009/10, 2010/11, 2011/12 and 2014/15. He also served as the chairman of UCSC owned company called Theekshana from 2010 to 2016. He also served as a board member of LEARN from 2010 to 2016.

He was a member of the Sri Lanka Informatics Olympiad since 1998 and was involved in organizing IOI training since 1998. He took part as the Deputy Team Leader in IOI 1999 in Turkey and in IOI in 2001–2007, 2009–2010, 2014 and 2016 as the team leader. He served as a Sri Lankan judge at APICTA from 2003 to 2007, 2009–2014, 2016 and was the chief judge in APICTA 2015.

Death
On 5 January 2018, Wikramanayake died at the age of 57 from motor neurone disease.

References

External links
University of Colombo School of Computing
BCS Sri Lanka Section Committee

1960 births
2018 deaths
Sri Lankan academic administrators
Sri Lankan computer scientists
Information systems researchers
Alumni of the University of Colombo
Alumni of the University of Wales
Alumni of Royal College, Colombo
Fellows of the British Computer Society
Alumni of St. Aloysius' College, Galle